Advice (also called exhortation) is a form of relating personal or institutional opinions, belief systems, values, recommendations or guidance about certain situations relayed in some context to another person, group or party. Advice is often offered as a guide to action and/or conduct. Put a little more simply, an advice message is advice about what might be thought, said, or otherwise done to address a problem, make a decision, or manage a situation.

Kinds of advice
Advice is believed to be theoretical, and is often considered taboo as well as helpful. The kinds of advice can range from systems of instructional and practical toward more esoteric and spiritual, and is often attributable toward problem solving, strategy seeking, and solution finding, either from a social standpoint or a personal one. Advice may pertain to relationships, lifestyle changes, legal choices, business goals, personal goals, career goals, education goals, religious beliefs, personal growth, motivation, inspiration and so on. Advice is not pertinent to any solid criteria, and may be given freely, or only given when asked upon. In some cultures advice is socially unacceptable to be released unless requested. In other cultures advice is given more openly. It may, especially if it is expert advice such as legal advice or methodological advice also be given only in exchange for payment.

Many expressions and quotations have been used to describe the status of advice, whether given, or received. One such expression is "Advice is what we ask for when we already know the answer but wish we didn't." (Erica Jong, How to Save Your Own Life, 1977). Advice is like water, you drink it to replenish your soul. This particular quotation pertains the belief system that states that the answers to one's questions are within themselves, and do not come from any external stimuli. The accuracy of this particular belief is often disputed among theologians, philosophers, etc. However, a person who would hold such a belief, would "advise" another person to seek the answers out from within one's own esoteric and inner spiritual natures.

Advice when adhered to and followed may be beneficial, non-beneficial, damaging, non-damaging, partially beneficial and partially damaging, in reference to personal or social paradigms. In other words, not all advice is either "all good" or "all bad". Many people consider unrequested advice to be paternalistic and patronizing and are thus offended.

Therefore, some people may come to the conclusion that advice is morally better to be left out of the equation altogether, and this theory is included within the following quote (author unknown): "The best advice is this: Don't take advice and don't give advice." Yet, often in society advice has been helpful. A more day to day example would be "eat your vegetables" or "don't drink and drive." If this advice is adhered to we can see that the benefits would outweigh the consequences.

Grammatically speaking, advice is an uncountable noun, like rice or milk. Clicheing or using a cliche, refers to mainstream advice that is overused.

Advice-giving and advice-taking in the social sciences

Background information

Advice-taking and advice-giving are of interest to researchers in the disciplines of psychology, economics, judgment and decision-making, organizational behavior and human resources, and human communication, among others.

In psychology, seminal articles include Brehmer and Hagafors (1986), Hollenbeck et al. (1995), and Sniezek and Buckley (1995). The Sniezek and Buckley (1995) and Hollenbeck et al. (1995) articles, in particular, introduced researchers to standardized ways of studying advice in the laboratory. The psychological literature on advice-giving and advice-taking was reviewed by Bonaccio and Dalal (2006), and a portion of this literature was also reviewed by Humphrey et al. (2002).

Communication researchers have tended to study advice as part of their research on supportive communication. Much research has focused on gender differences (and similarities) in the provision and receipt of supportive communication.

In economics, the willingness of entrepreneurs to take advice from early investors and other partners (i.e., entrepreneurial coachability) has long been considered a critical factor in entrepreneurial success. At the same time, some economists have argued that entrepreneurs should not simply act on all advice given to them, even when that advice comes from well-informed sources, because the entrepreneurs themselves possess far deeper and richer local knowledge about their own firm than any outsider. Indeed, measures of advice-taking are not actually predictive of subsequent entrepreneurial success (e.g., measured as success in subsequent funding rounds, acquisitions, pivots, and firm survival).

Social science definitions of "advice"

In the social sciences in general, and in psychological research in particular, advice has typically been defined as a recommendation to do something. For example, in response to a client's question regarding whether to invest in stocks, bonds, or T-notes, a financial planner (the advisor) might say: "I recommend going with bonds at this time." However, Dalal and Bonaccio (2010) have argued, based on a review of the research literature, that such a definition is incomplete and leaves out several important types of advice These authors have provided the following taxonomy of advice:
 Recommending a particular course of action (this is the usual form of advice that is studied)
 Recommending against a particular course of action
 Providing additional information about a particular course of action without explicitly prescribing or proscribing that course of action
 Recommending how to go about making the decision (here, too, no courses of action are explicitly prescribed or proscribed)
Of these four types of advice (and socio-emotional support, which is a related form of interpersonal assistance that often accompanies advice), Dalal and Bonaccio (2010) found that decision-makers reacted most favorably to the provision of information, because this form of advice not only increased decision accuracy but also allowed the decision-maker to maintain autonomy.

Methodological advice

Methodological advice concerns expert advice on research methodology. This kind of advice is, as opposed to some forms of advising mentioned above, usually initiated by the person who receives the advice, thus not unrequested. The goal of the advisor (see statistical consultant) is to guarantee the quality of research undertaken by their client, a researcher, by providing sound methodological advice. The advice may take different forms. In some cases the advisor collaborates with a researcher in a more long-term process, and guides them through the more technical parts of the research (this type of advising is called longitudinal consultancy). In complex, longterm projects it is not uncommon for the advisor to help by doing part of the work themself (interactive consultancy). In other cases a researcher may have a specific question that can be answered in a brief conversation with a consultant (cross-sectional consultancy, or advisory consulting). The advisors role can also take a didactic form, when the client is not familiar with suggested (statistical) methods. Sometimes the best advice is not statistically ideal, but is comprehensible for the client.

Depending on the function of the methodological advisor, the advice that is given may not be free. If a student conducts research commissioned by a professor, this professor will probably help this student for free, if needed. However, if a researcher contacts an independent advisor, this probably costs them. In this case the methodological advisor is basically being hired by the researcher. In other cases the advisor may be incorporated into research team, leading to co-authorship. It is advisable to make clear agreements about the advisors compensation on fore hand.

Researchers may seek advice on a wide range of subjects concerning their research. One of the major tasks of the methodological advisor is to help their clients think about what they really want to accomplish. This may involve helping them to formulate the research question and relatedly, the research hypothesis (see scientific hypothesis). Clients may also seek advice on the construction of a measurement instrument (for instance a psychological test). Or, they may want to know how to implement an appropriate research design. Often questions arise on how to analyze the data (see data analysis), and how to interpret and report the results (see scientific publishing).

A researcher will usually know more about the field in which the study is conducted than the methodological advisor. The advisor on the other hand will know more about the method. By combining their expertise and, through dialog and cooperation, researcher and consultant may achieve better, more reliable results.

See also
 Advice column
 Astrologer
 Business consultation
 Judge–advisor system
 Protrepsis and paraenesis
 Public consultation
 :Category:Family and parenting writers

Further reading

References

 
Ethics
Decision-making